Kai Hahto (born 31 December 1973 in Vaasa, Finland) is a Finnish musician and drummer.

Career

Hahto was a member of the grindcore band Rotten Sound.

In 2004 Hahto became one of the founders of the band Wintersun and left Rotten Sound later in 2005. In 2009-2012 Kai Hahto played about 300 shows with doom-death-metal band Swallow the Sun as a session drummer.

Hahto has an endorsement relationship with Meinl cymbals, Pearl drums and hardware, Balbex drumsticks, Roland V-Drums and Finfonic earphones. 

On 6 August 2014, it was announced that Hahto will be playing drums on the forthcoming Nightwish album, replacing Jukka Nevalainen, who went on hiatus from the band due to insomnia, and Hahto performed on all live shows since that date. On July 15, 2019, Hahto became Nightwish's permanent drummer following Nevalainen's decision not to return to the band.

In December 2020, it was announced that Hahto would be the drummer for the new lineup in Finnish black metal band Darkwoods My Betrothed, who had become active again.

Discography

References

Sources

External links

Official website
Official Wintersun website

1973 births
Living people
People from Vaasa
Finnish heavy metal drummers
21st-century drummers
Nightwish members
Wintersun members
Arthemesia members